Joseph George Willock (born 20 August 1999) is an English professional footballer who plays as a midfielder for Premier League club Newcastle United.

Career

Arsenal
A youth product of Arsenal, Willock joined Arsenal at age four-and-a-half, having been allowed to play alongside his older brothers. He made his first-team debut for the club on 20 September 2017 in the EFL Cup against Doncaster Rovers.

Willock made his Premier League debut against Newcastle United on 15 April 2018. He scored his first senior goal on 29 November 2018 in a 3–0 UEFA Europa League victory away at Vorskla Poltava. He then scored his first brace in a 3–0 FA Cup victory away at Blackpool on 5 January 2019.

On 12 September 2019, it was announced that Willock had signed a new long-term contract with Arsenal. On 19 September 2019, he played as Arsenal won 3–0 against Eintracht Frankfurt by scoring a deflected effort to open the scoring in the opening matchday of the 2019–20 UEFA Europa League. Willock scored his first goal at the Emirates Stadium on 24 September 2019 after tapping-in Arsenal's third goal in a 5–0 EFL Cup win over Nottingham Forest, set-up by Héctor Bellerín. On 25 June 2020, he scored his first Premier League goal in a 2–0 win over Southampton.

Newcastle United
On 1 February 2021, Willock joined Newcastle United on loan for the remainder of the 2020–21 season. On 6 February, Willock scored in the 16th minute on his debut in a 3–2 win over Southampton. After scoring in three consecutive substitute appearances against Tottenham Hotspur, West Ham United and Liverpool, Willock was rewarded with a start against Leicester City, where he was once again on target, scoring the opening goal in a 4–2 win. On 14 May, Willock scored in a 4–3 defeat against Manchester City. On 19 May, he scored in his sixth consecutive league game, becoming the youngest player in Premier League history to do so at the age of 21 years and 272 days, a record previously held by Romelu Lukaku. Four days later, on the final day of the Premier League season, he scored again to equal the club record of consecutive games scored in, set by Alan Shearer.

On 13 August 2021, Newcastle confirmed the signing of Willock on a six-year contract. The fee was reported to be £25 million. On 19 February 2022, Willock scored his first goal since signing permanently for the club, in a 1–1 draw against West Ham United. The following week, he scored Newcastle's second goal in a 2–0 win over Brentford.

International career
Willock scored for the England under-16 team against Scotland in the 2014 Victory Shield. He also represented the England under-19 team but was one of a number of players withdrawn from selection for the 2018 UEFA European Under-19 Championship by their club.

Willock represented the England under-20 team in the 2018–19 Under 20 Elite League and scored the winning goals in games against Italy and Germany. Willock was a member of an England Under-20 side at the 2019 Toulon Tournament and scored in group stage defeats against Portugal and Chile.

On 30 August 2019, Willock was included in the England under-21 squad for the first time but had to withdraw due to injury. He eventually made his U21 debut on 11 October 2019 during a 2–2 with Slovenia in Maribor.

Personal life
Willock was born in Waltham Forest, Greater London. His brothers, Chris and Matty, are also footballers. All three brothers shared a pitch when Manchester United played a reserve game against Arsenal in May 2017. He is of Montserratian descent.

Career statistics

Honours
Arsenal
FA Cup: 2019–20
FA Community Shield: 2017, 2020
UEFA Europa League runner-up: 2018–19

Newcastle United
EFL Cup runner-up: 2022–23

Individual
Premier League Player of the Month: May 2021

References

External links

Profile at the Newcastle United F.C. website

1999 births
Living people
Footballers from the London Borough of Waltham Forest
English footballers
Association football midfielders
Arsenal F.C. players
Newcastle United F.C. players
Premier League players
England youth international footballers
England under-21 international footballers
Black British sportsmen
English people of Montserratian descent